The fourth season of Fear the Walking Dead, an American horror-drama television series on AMC, premiered on April 15, 2018, and concluded on September 30, 2018, consisting of sixteen episodes. The series is a companion series to The Walking Dead, which is based on the comic book series of the same name by Robert Kirkman, Tony Moore, and Charlie Adlard, with the season premiere containing the first crossover between the two series. The executive producers are Kirkman, David Alpert, Greg Nicotero, Gale Anne Hurd, Scott M. Gimple, Andrew Chambliss, and Ian B. Goldberg, with Chambliss and Goldberg assuming the role of showrunner after Dave Erickson's departure from the series, while the series also moved to a new filming location, Austin, Texas.

The season marks a departure from the previous entries, with the story shifting from being a prequel to running concurrently with The Walking Dead. In addition to the group of Madison Clark (Kim Dickens), her daughter Alicia (Alycia Debnam-Carey), her drug-addicted son Nick (Frank Dillane), his lover Luciana Galvez (Danay García), and grifter Victor Strand (Colman Domingo) from the previous seasons, the story follows original series character Morgan Jones (Lennie James) as he encounters them amid their conflict with the antagonistic Vultures. Several new characters are also introduced in the fourth season, including journalist Althea Szewczyk-Przygocki (Maggie Grace), police officer John Dorie (Garret Dillahunt), and nurse June (Jenna Elfman).

Cast

Main cast

The fourth season features nine actors receiving main cast billing status, with five returning from the third season, while four new cast members are introduced. Lennie James (who was a main cast member in The Walking Dead), moved to the main cast after his departure from The Walking Dead. Maggie Grace, Garret Dillahunt and Jenna Elfman were added to the main cast. This is the first season not to include Cliff Curtis, Mercedes Mason, Daniel Sharman, Sam Underwood, Dayton Callie, Rubén Blades and Lisandra Tena (since their first appearances), who were all credited as main cast members in previous seasons.
 Kim Dickens as Madison Clark: An intelligent and domineering high school guidance counselor and the mother of Nick and Alicia.
 Frank Dillane as Nick Clark: A brave and selfless recovering heroin addict, Madison's son, and Alicia's brother.
 Alycia Debnam-Carey as Alicia Clark: The fiery yet compassionate daughter of Madison, and the sister of Nick.
 Maggie Grace as Althea "Al" Szewczyk-Przygocki: A curious and tactical journalist who encounters Morgan and John.
 Colman Domingo as Victor Strand: A smart and sophisticated conman-turned-businessman, who forms friendships with Nick and Madison.
 Danay García as Luciana Galvez: A strong and cautious former member of the La Colonia community in Tijuana, Mexico, and Nick's girlfriend.
 Garret Dillahunt as John Dorie: A lonesome and friendly police officer whom Morgan encounters.
 Lennie James as Morgan Jones: A mentally unstable and ruthlessly pragmatic man, formerly a part of Rick Grimes' group on The Walking Dead, who encounters the core group of survivors.
 Jenna Elfman as June "Naomi/Laura": A kind and mysterious nurse whom Madison encounters.

Supporting cast
 Kevin Zegers as Melvin: The antagonistic leader of the Vultures and the brother of Ennis.
 Evan Gamble as Ennis: A member of the Vultures and the brother of Melvin.
 Sebastian Sozzi as Cole: A resident of the community within the baseball stadium.
 Rhoda Griffis as Vivian: A resident of the community within the baseball stadium and the wife of Douglas.
 Alexa Nisenson as Charlie: A young girl who is a spy for the Vultures.
 Kenneth Wayne Bradley as Douglas: A resident of the community within the baseball stadium and the husband of Vivian.
 Aaron Stanford as Jim Brauer: A survivor who brews for a living.
 Daryl Mitchell as Wendell: The adoptive brother of Sarah who uses a wheelchair.
 Mo Collins as Sarah: The adoptive sister of Wendell and a former Marine.
 Tonya Pinkins as Martha: A mysterious antagonistic woman who kills every survivor that tries to help someone else.

Guest cast
 Andrew Lincoln as Rick Grimes: The main protagonist of The Walking Dead, Morgan's friend, and the leader of Alexandria, a Safe-Zone in Virginia.
 Melissa McBride as Carol Peletier: Morgan's friend from Virginia who resides in the Kingdom.
 Tom Payne as Paul "Jesus" Rovia: Morgan's friend from Virginia who resides in the Hilltop.
 Clint James as Leland: The antagonistic leader of a group who has a history with Althea.
 Stephen Henderson as Clayton "Polar Bear": A truck driver who left supplies for other survivors.

Episodes

Production and writing

On April 14, 2017, AMC renewed the series for a 16-episode fourth season and announced that Andrew Chambliss and Ian Goldberg would replace the departing Dave Erickson as showrunners. Production began in November 2017 in Austin, Texas. Michael E. Satrazemis, a director of photography for The Walking Dead and director of 12 episodes, joined Fear the Walking Dead as a directing-producer.

In November 2017, it was reported that Lennie James who portrays Morgan Jones on The Walking Dead would crossover and join the main cast in the fourth season. The fourth season also sees the additions of several new series regulars, played by Garret Dillahunt, Jenna Elfman, and Maggie Grace.

On April 21, 2018, Colman Domingo revealed that he would be directing the twelfth episode of this season.

The fourth season features a redesigned title sequence with new theme music. Each episode of the season has a different title card, and tells a story which will become apparent once the season is completed. The Hollywood Reporter reflected on the new intro, calling the new season, "a Western with zombies, very much by design."

Goldberg spoke of the season's narrative structure, which features multiple timelines:

The new showrunners also were inspired by Westerns; Chambliss stated, "It all started with the themes we set out at the beginning: isolation and community. Those themes run through a lot of classic Western stories." Visually, the season is inspired by John Ford and Sergio Leone's Westerns, using Once Upon a Time in the West as a template for directors. Chambliss said, "it's all about having wide shots, not moving the characters, but moving the characters within the frame. When we get to the editing room, it's really about slowing down the cutting pattern, and harkening back to that style of filmmaking. It does infuse the show with a different feel than what we've seen before. It's something that we're very excited for people to see."

The third episode of the season features the death of Nick Clark, played by Frank Dillane. In an interview after the episode had aired, Dillane revealed he asked to leave the show prior to the fourth season. The actor explained:

Release
On March 15, 2018, it was announced that the season premiere and the season eight finale of The Walking Dead would be screened at AMC, Regal, and Cinemark theaters across the United States on April 15, the same day as the televised airing, for "Survival Sunday: The Walking Dead & Fear the Walking Dead". The episodes marked the first crossover between the two series. The cinema screening also included an extra half-hour of exclusive bonus content.

Reception

Critical response
On Rotten Tomatoes, the fourth season has an approval rating of 80% based on 6 reviews, with an average rating of 6.85/10. The site's critical consensus is, "Fear the Walking Dead shuffles onward confidently in its fourth season with a bevy of horrifying set-pieces and heartbreaking twists, but some viewers may be dispirited by the series' constant reshuffling of its characters." TVLine reevaluated the series for its fourth season, giving it a "B+" grade. Reviewer Charlie Mason wrote, "it's gone from being an adequate stopgap between seasons of The Walking Dead to a show that's as good or arguably even better than the one from which it was spun off." He also praised the addition of Jenna Elfman and Garret Dillahunt and that season 4 has had several genuine surprises in its storytelling.

However, the decision to kill off lead character Madison Clark, portrayed by Kim Dickens, was met with intense criticism. Writing for The Hollywood Reporter, television critic Maureen Ryan highlighted the character as "one of TV's — and cable's — rare mature female leads" and cited her "baffling" demise as an example of Hollywood's ageist practices, adding, "the fact that this decision comes from The Walking Dead franchise, which has come under fire for its treatment of women and people of color in the past, is even more depressing."

Ratings

References

External links 
 
 

2018 American television seasons
04